The Columbia River Bridge at Wenatchee, Washington, also known as the Old Wenatchee Bridge, was built by the Washington Bridge Company in 1908, primarily as a means to carry irrigation water pipelines across the Columbia River. It was the first road bridge over the Columbia south of Canada. The bridge was purchased by the Washington highway department for $182,000 for highway use. However, the east approach to the bridge was built at a 6% grade, limiting its potential.

The bridge was replaced in 1950 by the Senator George Sellar Bridge. The next year the Wenatchee Reclamation District bought the bridge for $1.00, moving the pipes from outside the truss to within. The bridge was opened to foot traffic. In 2007 concerns were raised about the bridge's ability to sustain foot traffic. Repairs were made in 2010.

The bridge currently carries pedestrian and bicycle traffic as part of the Apple Capital Recreation Loop Trail. It was placed on the National Register of Historic Places on July 16, 1982.

References

Road bridges on the National Register of Historic Places in Washington (state)
Bridges completed in 1908
Bridges in Chelan County, Washington
Bridges in Douglas County, Washington
Bridges over the Columbia River
National Register of Historic Places in Chelan County, Washington
1908 establishments in Washington (state)
Cantilever bridges in the United States
Girder bridges in the United States
Pratt truss bridges in the United States
Metal bridges in the United States